The 2005 County Championship season, known as the Frizzell County Championship for sponsorship reasons, was contested through two divisions: Division One and Division Two. Each team played all the others in their division both home and away. The top three teams from Division Two were promoted to the first division for 2006, while the bottom three sides from Division 1 were relegated.

Teams
Teams in the County Championship 2005:

Points system

12 points for a win
6 points for a tie
4 points for a draw
4 points for an abandoned game
A maximum of 5 batting bonus points and 3 bowling bonus points

Division One

Standings

Division Two

Standings

Records

See also
2005 Cheltenham & Gloucester Trophy
2005 totesport League
2005 Twenty20 Cup

References

County Championship, 2005
County Championship seasons
County Championship